2008 Yokohama F. Marinos season

Competitions

Domestic results

J.League 1

Emperor's Cup

J.League Cup

Player statistics

Other pages
 J.League official site

Yokohama F. Marinos
Yokohama F. Marinos seasons